Naval Weapons Industrial Reserve Plant can refer to:

Naval Weapons Industrial Reserve Plant, Bedford
Naval Weapons Industrial Reserve Plant, Bethpage
Naval Weapons Industrial Reserve Plant, Calverton
Naval Weapons Industrial Reserve Plant, Dallas
Naval Weapons Industrial Reserve Plant, McGregor